Android Studio is the official integrated development environment (IDE) for Google's Android operating system, built on JetBrains' IntelliJ IDEA software and designed specifically for Android development. It is available for download on Windows, macOS and Linux based operating systems. It is a replacement for the Eclipse Android Development Tools (E-ADT) as the primary IDE for native Android application development.

Android Studio was announced on May 16, 2013, at the Google I/O conference. It was in early access preview stage starting from version 0.1 in May 2013, then entered beta stage starting from version 0.8 which was released in June 2014. The first stable build was released in December 2014, starting from version 1.0. At the end of 2015, Google dropped support for Eclipse ADT, making Android Studio the only officially supported IDE for Android development.

On May 7, 2019, Kotlin replaced Java as Google's preferred language for Android app development. Java is still supported, as is C++.

Features 
The following features are provided in the current stable version:

 Gradle-based build support
 Android-specific refactoring and quick fixes
 Lint tools to catch performance, usability, version compatibility and other problems
 ProGuard integration and app-signing capabilities
 Template-based wizards to create common Android designs and components
 A rich layout editor that allows users to drag-and-drop UI components, option to preview layouts on multiple screen configurations
 Support for building Android Wear apps
 Built-in support for Google Cloud Platform, enabling integration with Firebase Cloud Messaging (Earlier 'Google Cloud Messaging') and Google App Engine
 Android Virtual Device (Emulator) to run and debug apps in the Android studio.

Android Studio supports all the same programming languages of IntelliJ (and CLion) e.g. Java, C++, and more with extensions, such as Go; and Android Studio 3.0 or later supports Kotlin and "all Java 7 language features and a subset of Java 8 language features that vary by platform version." External projects backport some Java 9 features. While IntelliJ states that Android Studio supports all released Java versions, and Java 12, it's not clear to what level Android Studio supports Java versions up to Java 12 (the documentation mentions partial Java 8 support). At least some new language features up to Java 12 are usable in Android.

Once an app has been compiled with Android Studio, it can be published on the Google Play Store. The application has to be in line with the Google Play Store developer content policy.

Version history 
The following is a list of Android Studio's major releases:

System requirements 

These features includes requirements for IDE + Android SDK + Android Emulator.

 Windows: x86_64 CPU architecture; 2nd generation Intel Core or newer, or AMD CPU with support for a Windows Hypervisor;
 macOS: ARM-based chips, or 2nd generation Intel Core or newer with support for Hypervisor.Framework;
 Linux: x86_64 CPU architecture; 2nd generation Intel Core or newer, or AMD processor with support for AMD Virtualization (AMD-V) and SSSE3;
 Windows: CPU with UG (unrestricted guest) support;
 Intel Hardware Accelerated Execution Manager (HAXM)  6.2.1 or later (HAXM 7.2.0 or later recommended).

The use of hardware acceleration has additional requirements on Windows and Linux:

 Intel processor on Windows or Linux: Intel processor with support for Intel VT-x, Intel EM64T (Intel 64), and Execute Disable (XD) Bit functionality;
 AMD processor on Linux: AMD processor with support for AMD Virtualization (AMD-V) and Supplemental Streaming SIMD Extensions 3 (SSSE3);
 AMD processor on Windows: Android Studio 3.2 or higher and Windows 10 April 2018 release or higher for Windows Hypervisor Platform (WHPX) functionality.

For an attached webcam to work with Android 8.1 (API level 27) and higher system images, it must have the capability to capture 720p frames.

References

External links 
 Official homepage at developer.android.com

Integrated development environments
Android (operating system) development software
Linux integrated development environments
Linux programming tools
Software development kits
MacOS programming tools
Programming tools for Windows
Software using the Apache license
Free integrated development environments
Google software

tk:Android Studio